Coptops annulipes is a species of beetle in the family Cerambycidae. It was described by Charles Joseph Gahan in 1864. It is known from Malaysia, Cambodia, Indonesia, China, Laos, Myanmar, Thailand, India, and Vietnam.

Subspecies
 Coptops annulipes alorensis Breuning, 1967
 Coptops annulipes annulipes Gahan, 1894
 Coptops annulipes kangeana Breuning, 1968

References

annulipes
Beetles described in 1864